The Mozambican horseshoe bat (Rhinolophus mossambicus) is a species of horseshoe bat found in Africa.

Taxonomy
It was described as a new species in 2012. The holotype had been collected by A. Monadjem in July 2006 at Niassa Reserve in Mozambique. It was segregated from the Hildebrandt's horseshoe bat (R. hildebrandtii) species complex at the same time as the Smithers's horseshoe bat, Cohen's horseshoe bat, and Rhinolophus mabuensis. Its species name "mossambicus" refers to the country of Mozambique.

Description
It echolocates at a peak frequency of 35-38 kHz.

Range and habitat
Its range includes the African countries of Mozambique and Zimbabwe. It is associated with savanna habitats.

Conservation
As of 2017, it is evaluated as a least-concern species by the IUCN. Its population trend is, however, projected as decreasing due to threats such as hunting for bushmeat, as well as roost disturbance due to guano mining.

References

Mammals described in 2012
Bats of Africa
Rhinolophidae
Mammals of Mozambique
Mammals of Zimbabwe